Margarita Nikolaeva (23 September 1935 – 21 December 1993) was a Soviet gymnast. She competed at the 1960 Summer Olympics in Rome where she received a gold medal on vault (result - 19.316), and also a gold medal with the Soviet team (result - 382.320).

References

External links

1935 births
1993 deaths
Russian female artistic gymnasts
Soviet female artistic gymnasts
Gymnasts at the 1960 Summer Olympics
Olympic gymnasts of the Soviet Union
Olympic gold medalists for the Soviet Union
Olympic medalists in gymnastics
Sportspeople from Ivanovo
Medalists at the 1960 Summer Olympics
K. D. Ushinsky South Ukrainian National Pedagogical University alumni